Avatha ethiopica is a species of moth of the family Erebidae. It is found in the Democratic Republic of the Congo (East Kasai), Nigeria and Uganda.

References

Moths described in 1913
Avatha
Moths of Africa